The Slovenian Mountain Hiking Trail, sometimes also called Transverzala (Long-Distance Trail), is a route from Maribor to Ankaran. It covers most of the Slovenian mountain areas including Pohorje, the Julian Alps, the Kamnik-Savinja Alps, the Karawanks, and the southwestern part of Slovenia. It is the oldest hiking track in Europe.

History 

The idea of connecting the most beautiful, hilly, and mountainous area in Slovenia came from Ivan Šumljak in 1950. Originally, the trail was meant to be a circular route, which would start and end in Maribor. It was later changed to include Postojna and other areas towards the sea. It mostly included  existing hiking trails. However, on some shorter parts it was necessary to make new demarcations to connect them together.

The trail opened on August 1, 1953, with 80 control points. Since then, the trail has only changed slightly. These are the trail's current features: Control points: 80; Length: 599 km; Total ascent: 45.2 km; Total descent: 45.5 km.

There are 58 huts and two museums — the Slovene Alpine Museum in Mojstrana, and Franja Partisan Hospital (from World War II) — and the cave system named Škocjan Caves.

The first guided tour of Slovenski planinski transverzali was conducted in 1958. About 9500 hikers have completed the route over 60 years of the trail's history.

The Slovenian Mountain Hiking Trail also has an extended route with 42 control points throughout Slovenia.

Route 
It is possible to start in Maribor, Ankaran, or anywhere else on the circular route. Hikers must obtain a book from the Alpine Association of Slovenia in which they will be able to collect stamps that are located on mountain tops or huts along the way. If no stamp is available, a photo also counts. The hiking is not time limited.

The route consists mainly of easy trails, but there are also some more challenging ones.

Pohorje and northeastern area 
The control points of the trail on Pohorje Plateau and in the northeastern Slovenia are:
 Maribor Lodge (1068 m)
 Ruše Lodge near Areh (1246 m); Šumik Falls (1030 m)
 Klopni Vrh Lodge (1280 m)
 Pesek Lodge (1386 m); Lakes Lovrenc
 Ribnica Lodge (1507 m); Black Peak (1543 m)
 Grmovšek Lodge at Big Kopa (1371 m)
 Kremžar Peak Lodge (1102 m); Slovenj Gradec
 Postman's Lodge Below Plešivec (805 m)
 Mount St. Ursula Lodge (1670 m)
 Andrej Lodge at Sleme (1096 m)

Kamnik–Savinja Alps 

The control points of the trail in the Kamnik–Savinja Alps (northern Slovenia) are:
 Smrekovec Lodge (1377 m); Koča na Travniku (1548 m)
 Loka Lodge at Raduha (1520 m)
 Big Mount Raduha (2062 m)
 Grohat Lodge at Raduha (1460 m); Rogovilc Inn (610 m)
 Kocbek Lodge at Korošica (1808 m)
 Ojstrica (2350 m)
 Kamnik Saddle Lodge ((1864 m)
 Mount Turska (2251 m)
 Skuta (2532 m)
 Zois Lodge at Kokra Saddle (1793 m)
 Grintovec (2558 m)
 Kočna (2540 m)
 Czech Lodge at Spodnje Ravni (1543 m); Jezersko (880 m)
 Kališče Hiking Lodge (1534 m)
 Storžič (2132 m)
 Storžič Lodge (1123 m); Fat Peak (1715 m)
 Mount Križe Lodge (1471 m); Tržič (515 m)
 Dobrča Lodge (1478 m); Preval (1311 m)

Karawanks 

The control points of the trail in the Kamnik–Savinja Alps (northern Slovenia) are:
 Begunjščica (2060 m)
 Roblek Lodge at Begunjščica (1657 m)
 Zelenica Lodge (1536 m)
 Prešeren Lodge at Stol (2174 m); Golica Lodge (1582 m)
 Golica (1836 m)

Julian Alps 

The control points of the trail in the Kamnik–Savinja Alps (northern Slovenia) are:
 Slovenian Alpine Museum (641 m); Mojstrana (641 m)
 Aljaž Lodge in the Vrata Valley (1015 m)
 Valentin Stanič Lodge (2332 m) below Triglav
 Triglav Lodge at Kredarica (2515 m) 
 Triglav (2864 m)
 or Planika Lodge at Triglav (2404 m) or Trieste Lodge at Dolič (2151 m); Hole (1758 m); Bovec Mount Gamsovec (2392 m)
 Pogačnik Lodge at the Križ Plateau (2052 m)
 Razor (2601 m)
 Prisojnik (2547 m)
 Vršič Pass — Postman's Lodge at Vršič (1688 m) or Tičar Lodge at Vršič (1620 m) or Erjavec Lodge at Vršič (1515 m)
 Špiček Shelter (2064 m)
 Jalovec (2645 m)
 Soča Spring Lodge (886 m)
 Central Sava Valley at Prehodavci (2071 m)
 Triglav Lakes Lodge (1685 m)
 Komna — Komna Lodge (1520 m) or Bogatin Lodge (1513 m)
 Lakes Krn Lodge (1385 m)
 Gomišček Lodge at Krn (2182 m)
 Razor Pasture Lodge (1315 m)
 Vogel (1922 m)
 Rodica (1966 m)
 Zorko Jelinčič Lodge at Črna Prst (1835 m); Petrovo Brdo (803 m)
 Andrej Žvan a.k.a. "Boris" Lodge at Porezen (1590 m)
 Franja Partisan Hospital (536 m)

Southwestern area 

The control points of the trail in southwestern Slovenia are:
 Ermanovec Lodge (964 m)
 Bevk Peak (1051 m)
 Sivka — Cold Peak (1008 m); Idrija (325 m)
 Hleviše Pasture Lodge (818 m): Vojsko (1077m)
 Little Golak (1495 m); Iztok Lodge at Golaki (1260 m)
 Anton Bavčer Lodge at Čaven (1242 m)
 Azure Peak (1002 m); Col (619 m)
 Pirnat Lodge at Javornik (1156 m); Podkraj (797 m)
 Furlan Shelter at Abram (900 m)
 Vojko Lodge at Nanos (1201 m); Razdrto (577 m); Senožeče (580 m)
 Vremščica (1026 m); 
 Matavun — Škocjan Caves (393 m); Artviže (817 m); Markovščina (567 m)
 Tuma Lodge at Slavnik (1028 m); Prešnica (480 m)
 Socerb (389 m)
 Tinjan (374 m)
 Ankaran (19 m)

Old control points 
 Frischauf Lodge at Okrešelj (1396 m) 
 Kranj Lodge at Ledine (1700 m)
 Koroška Rinka (2433 m)
 Valvasor Lodge at Stol (1180 m)
 Pristava Lodge in Javorniški Rovt (930 m)
 Golica Lodge (933 m)
 Rudar Lodge at Vojsko (1080 m)
 Predjama (503 m)
 Sveta Trojica (mountain) (1106 m)

Extended Slovenian Mountain Hiking Trail

The Extended Slovenian Mountain Hiking Trail was created in 1966 to include mountains that are dispersed all over the country and are not connected. Until 1993 it had 18 mandatory and 20 non-mandatory control points. (10 of them are over 1000 m high). Then it was enhanced to 35 obligatory control points and one hill.

Julian Alps
 Stol (Julian Alps) (1673 m)
 High Kanin (2587 m) or Rombon (2208 m)
 Mangart (2678 m)
 Bavšica Mount Grintavec (2347 m)
 Škrlatica (2740 m) or Špik (2472 m)
 Debela Peč (2014 m)
 Ratitovec — Krek Lodge at Ratitovec (1642 m)

Karawanks
 Big Peak (Košuta) (2088 m)
 Olševa (1929 m)
 Peca — Kordež Head (2125 m)

Kamnik–Savinja Alps
 Cold Mountain (2203 m), non-mandatory
 Menina Pasture — Menina Pasture Lodge (1453 m)

Northeastern Slovenia

 Paka Mount Kozjak — Paka Kozjak Lodge (960 m)
 Košenjak (1522 m)
 Žavcar Peak — Žavcar Peak Lodge (863 m)
 Zavrh in the Slovene Hills (370 m)
 Jeruzalem, Ljutomer (338 m)
 Selo, Moravske Toplice (295 m)
 Mount Saint Donatus (882 m)
 Boč (979 m)

Sava Hills
 Bohor — Bohor Lodge (898 m) or Lisca — Tonček Lodge (927 m)
 Resevna — Resevna Lodge (645 m)
 Mrzlica — Mrzlica Lodge (1093 m) or Kum — Kum Lodge (1211 m)
 Geometric Centre of the Republic of Slovenia – GEOSS (645 m)

Lower Carniola and White Carniola

 Gradišče — Lavrič Lodge at Gradišče (510 m)
 Little Mountain — St. Anne Lodge (910 m)
 Gorjanci — Trdina Peak (1178 m)
 Mount Mirna — Mount Mirna Lodge (1000 m)

Inner Carniola
 Big Snežnik — Drago Karolin Lodge at Big Snežnik (1796 m)
 Slivnica — Slivnica Lodge (1075 m)
 Krim — Krim Lodge (1107 m)

Polhov Gradec Hills
 Grmada (898 m)

Škofja Loka Hills

 Lubnik — Lubnik Lodge (1025 m)

Littoral
 Matajur (1642 m)
 Korada — Korada Shelter (803 m)
 Trstelj — Stjenko Lodge at Trstelj (610 m)

See also
List of mountains in Slovenia

References

External links

1953 establishments in Slovenia
Hiking trails in Slovenia
Mountaineering in Slovenia